Phil or Philip Berger may refer to: 
 Philip E. Berger (born 1952), member of the North Carolina General Assembly
 Phil Berger Jr. (born 1972), his son, American attorney and jurist
 Phil Berger (ice hockey) (born 1966), American ice hockey player and coach